Çıplak Island (meaning "Barren island", Chalkis of the antiquity, in Greek known as Gymno) is an Aegean island of Turkey.

With an area of   it is one of the larger islands around Ayvalık. It’s the southernmost island of the Ayvalık Islands archipelago, and the only one with shores to both Edremit Gulf and Dikili Gulf.

The uninhabited island was a natural pasture for sheep breeding. Every year the shepherds used to bring sheep herd to the island. However they now complain of rabbits which infest the grazing land.

References

Aegean islands
Islands of Turkey
Islands of Balıkesir Province